Major General Clifton Ralph Russell Hoeben,  (born 7 June 1947) is an Australian judge and soldier.

Early life and education
He was dux of the school at Saint Ignatius' College, Riverview in 1964 and graduated from the University of Sydney with a Bachelor of Arts Degree with First-Class Honours in Ancient Greek and Latin in 1968, a Bachelor of Laws Degree with Honours in 1972 and a Master of Laws Degree with Honours in 1984.

Career
Hoeben is a judge of the Supreme Court of New South Wales. He will retire from the Supreme Court bench on 31 August 2021.

Hoeben also rose to the rank of major general as Commander of the 2nd Division in the Australian Army Reserve.

References

External links
Obeid Sues over Bulldogs Article, Sydney Morning Herald, Malcolm Brown, 14 August 2006.

1947 births
Australian generals
Judges of the Supreme Court of New South Wales
Living people
Members of the Order of Australia
Sydney Law School alumni
People educated at Saint Ignatius' College, Riverview